Cycle polo was featured in the Summer Olympic Games unofficial programme in 1908.

See also
 1908 Summer Olympics
 Cycle polo

References

Olympics
Discontinued sports at the Summer Olympics
1908 Summer Olympics events
1908 Summer Olympics
1908 in polo
Men's events at the 1908 Summer Olympics